The Jerez (Serbian Cyrillic: Јерез) is a river in western Serbia, a 56 km-long right tributary to the Sava river.

Pocerina section
The Jerez originates from the western slopes of the Cer mountain in the hilly Pocerina region of western Serbia, near the village of Čokešina. It flows generally into the south-to-north direction, curving a lot between the villages of Prnjavor, a regional center of Pocerina, Ribari and Petlovača, where the Jerez enters the Kurjačko polje (Wolf's field) of the low Mačva region.

The bed of Jerez is actually an ancient bed of the Drina river, which used to flow into the Sava at Šabac. When the Drina changed its course several dozens of kilometers to the west, the waters springing out from the Cer mountain filled the empty river bed and the river Jerez was created.

Mačva section
In the Mačva lowlands, the Jerez meanders a lot, splits in several flows, some of which rejoin the central flow of the river, others connecting it to the nearby rivers and streams. Large village of Štitar is located on one of such parallel flows. Between the villages of Mačvanski Pričinović and Tabanović, the river bends to the south, enters the floodplain of the Posavina region and empties into the Sava river in the northern outskirts of Šabac, creating a minute delta.

The Jerez river valley is a route for the road and railway Šabac-Loznica.

The river drains an area of 503 km², belongs to the Black Sea drainage basin and it is not navigable.

Rivers of Serbia